Golden moles are small insectivorous burrowing mammals endemic to Sub-Saharan Africa. They comprise the family Chrysochloridae and as such they are taxonomically distinct from the true moles, family Talpidae, and other mole-like families, all of which, to various degrees, they resemble as a result of evolutionary convergence. There are 21 species. Some (e.g., Chrysochloris asiatica, Amblysomus hottentotus) are relatively common, whereas others (e.g., species of Chrysospalax, Cryptochloris, Neamblysomus) are rare and endangered.

Characteristics and affinities
Like most burrowing mammals with similar habits, the Chrysochloridae have short legs with powerful digging claws, very dense fur that repels dirt and moisture, and toughened skin, particularly on the head. Their eyes are non-functional and covered with furred skin. The external ears are just tiny openings. In particular, golden moles bear a remarkable resemblance to the marsupial moles of Australia, family Notoryctidae, which they resemble so suggestively that at one time, the marsupial/placental divide notwithstanding, some argued that they were related. Considerations that influenced the debate might have included the view that the Chrysochloridae are very primitive placentals and the fact that they have many mole-like specializations similar to specializations in marsupial moles. The rhinarium is a greatly enlarged, dry leathery pad that protects their nostrils while the animal digs. In this respect, too, they resemble the marsupial moles. Some authors claim their primary sense is of touch, and they are particularly sensitive to vibrations, which may indicate approaching danger. Note below, however, the observations on the malleus in the middle ear.

They have muscular shoulders and the forelimbs are radically adapted for digging; all the toes on the forefeet have been reduced, except for a large, pick-like third claw on the third toe. The fifth digit is absent and the first and fourth digits are vestigial. The adaptations of the hind feet are less dramatic: They retain all five toes and are webbed as an adaptation to efficient backward shovelling of soil loosened by the front claws.

At one time, the Chrysochloridae were regarded as primitive. Supporting arguments of this included that they were thought to have originated in Gondwana, that they had a low resting metabolic rate, and that they could switch off thermoregulation when inactive. Like the tenrecs, they possess a cloaca, and males lack a scrotum. However, these points are no longer regarded as strongly suggestive of golden moles as undeveloped "reptilian mammals"; some are seen rather as adaptations to regional climatic conditions. Going into a torpor when resting or during cold weather enables them to conserve energy and reduce urgent requirements for food. Similarly, they have developed particularly efficient kidneys, and most species do not need to drink water at all; in fact, they tend to drown easily if they fall into water.

Habits and ecology
Chrysochloridae are subterranean, afrotherian mammals endemic to sub-Saharan Africa, and most of which are recorded from South Africa in particular. Other regions include Lake Victoria, Western Cape, and Namibia. They live in a variety of environments; forest, swamps, deserts, or mountainous terrain. However, Chrysospalax species tend to forage above ground in leaf litter in forests or in meadows. Eremitalpa species such as Grant's golden mole live in the sandy Namib desert, where they cannot form tunnels because the sand collapses. Instead during the day, when they must seek shelter, they "swim" through the loose sand, using their broad claws to paddle, and dive down some 50 cm to where it is bearably cool. There they enter a state of torpor, thus conserving energy. At night they emerge to forage on the surface rather than wasting energy shifting sand. Their main prey are termites that live under isolated grass clumps, and they might travel for 6 kilometres a night in search of food. They seek promising clumps by listening for wind-rustled grass-root stresses and termites' head-banging alarm signals, neither of which can be heard easily above ground, so they stop periodically and dip their heads under the sand to listen.

Most other species construct both foraging superficial burrows and deeper permanent burrows for residence. Residential burrows are relatively complex in form, and may penetrate as far as a metre below ground and include deep chambers for use for refuge, and other chambers as latrines. They push excavated soil up to the surface, as in mole-hills, or compact it into the tunnel walls. 
They feed on small insects and earthworms or small vertebrates such as lizards or burrowing snakes. They depend on their sense of hearing to locate much of their prey, and the cochleas of a number of golden mole species have been found to be long and highly coiled, which may indicate a greater ecological dependence on low frequency auditory cues than we see in Talpid moles.

Morphology
Golden Moles share a number of features, varying by species, seldom seen elsewhere among living mammals, including three forearm long-bones, hyoid-mandible articulation, and a hypertrophied malleus.  Some species have hypertrophied (enlarged) middle ear ossicles, in particular the malleus. These animals have the  largest malleus relative to body size of any animal. This morphology may be adapted for the detection of seismic signals. In this respect there is some apparent convergent evolution to burrowing reptiles in the family Amphisbaenidae.

Reproduction
Females give birth to one to three hairless young in a grass-lined nest within the burrow system. Breeding occurs throughout the year. The adults are solitary, and their burrowing territory may be aggressively defended from intruders, especially where resources are relatively scarce.

Status
Of the 21 species of golden mole, no fewer than 11 are threatened with extinction. The primary cause being human-induced habitat loss, additionally sand mining, poor agricultural practices, and predation by domestic cats and dogs are causes of population decline.

Classification

The taxonomy of the Chrysochloridae is undergoing a review in the light of new genetic information. They have traditionally been listed with the shrews, hedgehogs and a grab-bag of small, difficult-to-place creatures as part of the order Insectivora. Some authorities retain this classification, at least for the time being. Others group the golden moles with the tenrecs in a new order, which is sometimes known as Tenrecomorpha, while others call it Afrosoricida and reserve Tenrecomorpha for the family Tenrecidae.

 ORDER AFROSORICIDA
 Suborder Tenrecomorpha
 Family Tenrecidae: tenrecs, 34 species in 10 genera
 Suborder Chrysochloridea
 Family Chrysochloridae
 Subfamily Chrysochlorinae
 Genus Carpitalpa
 Arends's golden mole (Carpitalpa arendsi)
 Genus Chlorotalpa
 Duthie's golden mole (Chlorotalpa duthieae)
 Sclater's golden mole (Chlorotalpa sclateri)
 Genus Chrysochloris
 Subgenus Chrysochloris
 Cape golden mole (Chrysochloris asiatica)
 Visagie's golden mole (Chrysochloris visagiei)
 Subgenus Kilimatalpa
 Stuhlmann's golden mole (Chrysochloris stuhlmanni)
 Genus Chrysospalax
 Giant golden mole (Chrysospalax trevelyani)
 Rough-haired golden mole (Chrysospalax villosus)
 Genus Cryptochloris
 De Winton's golden mole (Cryptochloris wintoni)
 Van Zyl's golden mole (Cryptochloris zyli)
 Genus Eremitalpa
 Grant's golden mole (Eremitalpa granti)
 Subfamily Amblysominae
 Genus Amblysomus
 Fynbos golden mole (Amblysomus corriae)
 Hottentot golden mole (Amblysomus hottentotus)
 Marley's golden mole (Amblysomus marleyi)
 Robust golden mole (Amblysomus robustus)
 Highveld golden mole (Amblysomus septentrionalis)
 Genus Calcochloris
 Subgenus Calcochloris
 Yellow golden mole (Calcochloris obtusirostris)
 Subgenus incertae sedis
 Somali golden mole (Calcochloris tytonis)
Genus Huetia
 Congo golden mole (Huetia leucorhina)
 Genus Neamblysomus
 Juliana's golden mole (Neamblysomus julianae)
 Gunning's golden mole (Neamblysomus gunningi)

References

Afrosoricida
Extant Lutetian first appearances
Taxa named by John Edward Gray